Collorec is a commune in the Finistère department of Brittany in north-western France.

Demographics
The inhabitants of Collorec are called in French Collorecois.

See also
Communes of the Finistère department
Listing of the works of the atelier of the Maître de Tronoën

References

External links

Official website 

Mayors of Finistère Association  

Communes of Finistère